Carstens is a surname. Notable people with the surname include:

Agustín Carstens (b. 1958), Mexican economist
Arno Carstens, South African singer-songwriter
Asmus Jacob Carstens (1754–1798), Danish-German painter
Camilla Carstens (b. 1977), Norwegian team handball player
Carl Wilhelm Carstens (1887–1950), Norwegian geologist
David Carstens (1914–1955), South African boxer
Deon Carstens (b. 1979), South African rugby union footballer
Harold H. Carstens (1925–2009), president of Carstens Publications
Ingvild Ryggen Carstens (b. 1980), Norwegian ski mountaineer, heptathlete and pentathlete
Jordan Carstens (b. 1981), American football defensive tackle
Karl Carstens (1914–1992), German politician and president of the Federal Republic of Germany
Lesley Carstens (b. 1965), South African sprint canoer
Lina Carstens (1892–1978), German film- and theater actress
Manfred Carstens (born 1943), German politician (CDU)
Nico Carstens, South African accordionist and songwriter
Peter Carstens (1903–1945), German geneticist and animal breeder and SS-Oberführer
Theodore Carstens, American fencer 
Veronica Carstens (1923–2012), wife of the German President Karl Carstens
Wilhelm Carstens (1869–19??), German rower

See also 
Karsten
Karstens

German-language surnames